Louis Joseph Harant (November 20, 1895 – July 2, 1986) was an American sport shooter who competed in the 1920 Summer Olympics.

In 1920 he won the gold medal as member of the American team in the team 30 metre military pistol competition. He also participated in the individual 30 metre military pistol event and finished fourth.

He was born in Baltimore, Maryland and died in Vero Beach, Florida.

References

External links
profile

1895 births
1986 deaths
American male sport shooters
United States Distinguished Marksman
ISSF pistol shooters
Shooters at the 1920 Summer Olympics
Olympic gold medalists for the United States in shooting
Olympic medalists in shooting
Medalists at the 1920 Summer Olympics
19th-century American people
20th-century American people